Johannes Piiper (22 April 1882 Tallinn – 5 October 1973 Tartu) was an Estonian zoologist and nature writer.

In 1913 he graduated from St. Petersburg University. From 1919 to 1959 he taught at Tartu State University. From 1922 to 1940 he was the head of Kuusnõmme Biological Station. From 1922 to 1930 and 1932 to 1935 he was the head of Tartu University Zoological Museum.

From 1922 to 1924 he was the chief editor of the journal Loodus.

He is also known as the founder of the Estonian ornithological school .

Awards:
 1957: Estonian SSR merited scientist

Works
 Üldise zooloogia põhijooned (1920)
 Loomageograafia (1926)
 Pilte ja hääli kodumaa loodusest (1935)
 Pilte ja hääli Eesti loodusest (1948, 1975)
 Rännakud Eesti radadel (1968)

References

1882 births
1973 deaths
Estonian zoologists
Estonian non-fiction writers
Estonian editors
Saint Petersburg State University alumni
Academic staff of the University of Tartu
Writers from Tallinn
People from Tallinn